The Presbyterian Church building in Beaver, Oklahoma, is a historic church building built in 1887. It was one of the earliest permanent religious buildings built in the Oklahoma Panhandle. The church is a wood-frame structure with a front gable roof and small bell tower over the front entrance. It was listed on the National Register of Historic Places on May 16, 1974, for architectural significance and association with settlement of the area.

It is located at 3rd St. and Ave. E in Beaver.

References

Oklahoma State Historic Preservation Office

Churches on the National Register of Historic Places in Oklahoma
Buildings and structures in Beaver County, Oklahoma
Presbyterian churches in Oklahoma
National Register of Historic Places in Beaver County, Oklahoma